Como is an unincorporated community in Jefferson Township, Jay County, Indiana.

History
A post office was established at Como in 1882, and remained in operation until it was discontinued in 1904. The name of the community was likely borrowed from Como, in Italy.

Geography

References

Unincorporated communities in Jay County, Indiana
Unincorporated communities in Indiana